Won may refer to:

The Korean won from 1902–1910
South Korean won, the currency of the Republic of Korea
North Korean won, the currency of the Democratic People's Republic of Korea
 Won (Korean surname)
 Won (Korean given name)
 Won Buddhism, a specific form of Korean Buddhism (圓)
 Won (injustice), a social concept in Joseon Korea (冤)
 Lugart Won, a fictional character

In music 

Won (As Friends Rust album), a 2001 album by As Friends Rust
 Won, 2002 album by Pacewon

WON may refer to:

 WO-N - Warrant Officer of the Australian Navy
 Western Outdoor News, a 'sportsmans weekly' publication based in California, USA
 WON Bass, a competitive bass fishing series of tournaments
 Wrestling Observer Newsletter, a professional wrestling newsletter written by Dave Meltzer
 World Ocean Network, an international non-profit association of organizations to promote the sustainable use of the oceans
 World Opponent Network, a former online gaming service
 The ICAO airline code for Wings Air
 The National Rail station code for Walton-on-the-Naze railway station, Tendring, England

See also
 Chinese yuan, the currency of China, sometimes confused with Won
 Yen, the currency of Japan, sometimes confused with Won

ru:WON